Church mouse may refer to:

The Church Mouse, a 1934 film

See also
Mouse
Poor as a Church Mouse, a 1931 German film
Robert Thompson (designer), a British furniture maker who used a mouse motif, derived from the phrase